This is a list of the wool, cotton and other textile mills in Calderdale, England: this is Halifax, Brighouse and Todmorden with Elland, Hebden Royd and Ripponden.

Barkisland (Ripponden)

Clifton (Brighouse)

Cliviger (Todmorden)

Erringden (Hebden Royd)

Halifax

Heptonstall (Hebden Royd; Heptonstall)

Hipperholme cum Brighouse (Brighouse)

Langfield (Todmorden)

Midgley (Hebden Royd; Sowerby Bridge; Wadsworth)

Norland (Sowerby Bridge)

Northowram

Ovenden (Halifax)

Rastrick (Brighouse)

Rishworth (Ripponden)

Skircoat (Halifax)

Southowram

Sowerby (Hebden Royd; Sowerby Bridge)

Soyland (Ripponden; Sowerby Bridge)

Stansfield (Todmorden)

Todmorden And Walsden

Wadsworth (Hebden Royd; Wadsworth)

Warley

Wyke (Brighouse; Wyke)

See also
Heavy Woollen District
Textile processing

References
Footnotes

The National Monument Record is a legacy numbering system maintained by English Heritage.  Further details on each mill may be obtained from this url. http://yorkshire.u08.eu/

Notes

Bibliography

External links

 01
Calderdale
Calderdale
Buildings and structures in Calderdale
Calderdale
Calderdale
History of the textile industry
Industrial Revolution in England